The North Midlands Rugby Football Union is a governing body for rugby union in part of The Midlands, England. The union is the constituent body of the Rugby Football Union for the counties of Herefordshire, Shropshire, Worcestershire and the Greater Birmingham area.

History 
The North Midlands RFU was founded at a meeting in Birmingham on 14 January 1920. The area had previously been part of the Midland Counties Rugby Union, from which Warwickshire split in 1914, with further changes in 1919 leading to Leicestershire Rugby Union becoming a county on its own and North Midlands being created for the Birmingham, Derbyshire, Staffordshire and Worcestershire areas. The majority of the clubs in the union's initial membership came from the Birmingham area. Staffordshire separated from North Midlands in 1964 to become a county on its own.

County team 
The North Midlands men's county team play in the County Championship, competing in Division 3.

Honours
Tetley's County Shield winners: 2004

Affiliated clubs
There are currently 71 clubs affiliated with the North Midlands RFU, most of which have teams at both senior and junior level, although some of the more prominent second teams have also been listed by the North Midlands RFU as affiliated clubs.  The North Midlands region covers a large area with club sides based in Birmingham and the West Midlands, Herefordshire, Shropshire and Worcestershire.  Occasionally clubs based in other county rugby football unions, such as Staffordshire and Warwickshire, are also members of the North Midlands RFU.  This was a result of county boundaries changing in 1974 as a consequence of the Local Government Act 1972. 

Aldridge
Aston Old Edwardians
Birmingham Barbarians
Birmingham Bulls
Birmingham Civil Service
Birmingham Exiles
Birmingham Medics
Birmingham Moseley
Birmingham & Solihull
Birmingham Wyvern
Bishops Castle & Onny Valley
Bloxwich 
Bournville
Bredon Star
Bridgnorth
Bromsgrove
Bromyard
Camp Hill
Chaddesley Corbett
Church Stretton Samurai
Clee Hill
Cleobury Mortimer
Dixonians
Droitwich
Dudley Kingswinford
Dudley Wasps
Edwardians
Erdington 
Essington 
Evesham
Five Ways Old Edwardians
Greyhound
Harborne
Hereford
Highley
Kidderminster Carolians
Kings Norton
Ledbury
Luctonians
Ludlow
Malvern
Market Drayton
Moseley Oak
Newport (Salop)
Old Griffinians
Old Halesonians
Old Saltleians
Old Yardleians
Oswestry
Pershore
Redditch
Ross-on-Wye 
Shrewsbury
Silhillians 
Solihull
Stourbridge
Stourbridge Lions
Stourport
Sutton Coldfield 
Telford Hornets
Tenbury Wells
Upton-upon-Severn
Veseyans
Walsall 
Warley
West Mercia Constabulary 
West Midlands Police
Whitchurch
Woodrush
Worcester Warriors
Worcester Wanderers
Yardley & District

County club competitions 

The North Midlands currently runs the following competition for clubs sides based in Birmingham and the West Midlands, Herefordshire, Shropshire and Worcestershire:

Cups
North Midlands Cup – founded in 1972, currently open to clubs at tiers 5–6 of the English rugby union system
North Midlands Shield – founded in 2001, clubs at tiers 7–8
North Midlands Vase – founded in 2005, clubs at tiers 9–10

Discontinued competitions
North Midlands 1 - tier 7-10 league that ran between 1987 to 2006
North Midlands 2 - tier 8-11 league that ran between 1987 to 2006
North Midlands 3 – tier 9-12 league that ran intermittently between 1987 and 2004
North Midlands 4 – tier 10 league that ran between 1987 to 1992
Midlands 5 West (North) – tier 10 league for North Midlands and Staffordshire clubs that ran between 2005 and 2019

Notes

See also
Midland Division
English rugby union system

References

External links
 North Midlands RFU website

Rugby union governing bodies in England
1920 establishments in England
Sports organizations established in 1920
Rugby union in Herefordshire
Rugby union in Shropshire
Rugby union in Worcestershire
Sport in Birmingham, West Midlands